Alan Rothery (born 19 February 1983) is an Australian former professional rugby league footballer who played in the 2000s, he last played for the Central Queensland Comets in the Queensland Cup. He had previously played for the Canberra Raiders in the NRL.

References

External links
Central Queensland Comets profile

1983 births
Living people
Australian rugby league players
Canberra Raiders players
Central Queensland Capras players
Rugby league second-rows
Rugby league locks
Rugby league props
Rugby league players from Rockhampton, Queensland